Henry Brooke (1703 – 10 October 1783) was an Irish novelist and dramatist. He was born and raised at Rantavan House near Mullagh, a village in the far south of County Cavan in Ireland, the son of a clergyman, and he later studied law at Trinity College, Dublin, but embraced literature as a career.

Brooke's father was The Reverend William Brooke, the well-off Church of Ireland Rector of Killinkere and Mullagh within the Church of Ireland Diocese of Kilmore. Henry first began his career as a poet.  His now forgotten Universal Beauty was published in 1735, and Alexander Pope thought its sentiments and poetry fine.  He then turned dramatist by adapting extant plays, such as The Earl of Essex. He wrote from the Tory point of view and became one of the most important figures in Augustan drama, although not for his successes.  

His Gustavus Vasa (1739) has the distinction of being the first play banned by the Licensing Act of 1737. The play concerned the liberation of Sweden from Denmark in 1521 by Riksföreståndare (Protector of the Realm or Regent) Gustav Vasa (who later became King Gustav I of Sweden). Sir Robert Walpole believed that the villain of the play resembled him.  Further, a facetious "attack" on it was the first public writing of Samuel Johnson, whose A Complete Vindication of the Licensers of the English Stage feigns support for Walpole while it drives the censor's argument to reductio ad absurdum.

Brooke lived in Ireland most of his life, but he spent time in London when his plays were on the stage.  In politics, he was somewhat radical in arguing publicly for loosening the laws persecuting Roman Catholics in the United Kingdom.  His daughter Charlotte Brooke was herself an important figure in the history of Irish literature,  publishing Reliques of Irish Poetry (1789) and working to increase the profile of Irish language poetry.

Later, his Earl of Essex came back to the boards in a revival.  Again, Samuel Johnson offered his public support of Brooke, but when he heard the Earl saying at the end of Act II, "Who rules o'er free men must himself be free," Johnson replied, "Who drives fat oxen must himself be fat."  Although Johnson was objecting to the misuse and overuse of "freedom" and was at that time in a vexatious debate over the United States War of Independence (saying, "Why is it that we hear the loudest cries for liberty from the drivers of Negroes?"), Brooke was mortified by Johnson's parody and changed the line for his Collected Works.

Brooke had a difficult life and made a very poor living.  The Licensing Act robbed him of his primary avenue to making a living, for, after the Act, he was the first man banned by it.  Whatever fame this lent him was made up for by his inability to get new plays performed.  His greatest commercial successes came from the Earl of Essex and his two novels, The Fool of Quality (1760-1772) and Juliet Grenville (1774), which are two of the finest sentimental novels.  John Wesley was so fond of The Fool of Quality, in which Brooke declares his belief in universal salvation, that he sought to have a copy of it given out to all new Methodist churches.

He had twenty-two children.  Of these, only Charlotte survived adolescence. She shepherded his Works through the press after his death.

References

External links

Brooke at Princess Grace Irish Library 
 
 

1703 births
1783 deaths
18th-century Anglo-Irish people
Irish male dramatists and playwrights
People from County Cavan
18th-century Christian universalists
18th-century Irish dramatists and playwrights
18th-century Irish novelists
Irish male novelists
18th-century Irish male writers